Thomas Jefferson Morgan was an American Brevet Brigadier General during the American Civil War. He commanded the 14th United States Colored Infantry Regiment throughout the middle and end of the war. Later on, he became a prominent member of the Rochester Theological Seminary and would go on to be a prominent teaching figure across the United States. His works were renowned across the education world and managed to become vice president of the National Education Association from 1887 to 1889 and the Commissioner of Indian Affairs from 1889 to 1893.

American Civil War
Thomas was born on August 17, 1839, at Franklin, Indiana. After graduating from the college, Morgan immediately enlisted in the 7th Indiana Infantry Regiment for around three months before his tenure expired and temporarily became a teacher at Atlanta, Illinois.

Morgan re-enlisted in the Union Army on August 1, 1862, as a First Lieutenant of the 70th Indiana Infantry Regiment but then organized to be the Lieutenant Colonel of the 14th United States Colored Infantry Regiment on November 1, 1863. After being promoted to Colonel on New Years of 1864, he organized 2 other regiments took command of the First Colored Brigade of the Army of the Cumberland. He went on to participate at the Atlanta campaign as well as the Battle of Nashville while being in the general staff of Oliver Otis Howard.

Morgan was brevetted Brigadier General on March 13, 1865, before resigning on April 1, 1865.

Post-War Career
After the war, Morgan attended the Rochester Theological Seminary. In 1869, he was made Baptist minister and served as the Corresponding Secretary for the New York Union for Ministerial Union and became a pastor at Brownville, Nebraska in the following year. In 1872, he became the principal of the Nebraska State Normal School before later on, took similar positions at the Potsdam Normal School and the Rhode Island State Normal School. After the election of Benjamin Harrison, Morgan was a member of the Anti-Catholic League for the Protection of American Institutions and for the remaining years of his life, advocated for the American Protective Association. Around the time of Harrison's presidency, Morgan was made the Commissioner of Indian Affairs in 1889 in order to promote education within Native Americans as Morgan had previous experience within the National Education Association as he frequently attended their meetings and became vice president from 1887 to 1889. Morgan viewed education on Native Americans as an easy way for them to fit into society and that the system itself can be improved with one generation. Morgan was also an advocate for Chinese immigration in the United States, actively protesting the legislation for discriminating against Chinese immigrants. He resigned in 1893 to become the secretary of the Home Mission society as well as founding the Delta Chapter of Phi Delta Theta fraternity in Franklin College. After his death on July 13, 1902, he was buried at Mount Hope Cemetery, Rochester, New York.

See also
List of American Civil War brevet generals (Union)
Bureau of Indian Affairs

References

1839 births
1902 deaths
People from Franklin, Indiana
Union Army colonels
Union Army generals
People of Indiana in the American Civil War
19th-century American educators
Anti-Catholic activists
National Education Association people
19th-century Baptist ministers from the United States
Franklin College (Indiana) alumni
Burials at Mount Hope Cemetery (Rochester)